WFK or wfk may also refer to

 The wfk - Cleaning Technology Research Institute
 WFK - IATA code for Northern Aroostook Regional Airport